The Mussau fantail (Rhipidura matthiae) or Matthias fantail, is a fantail which is endemic to Mussau Island in the St. Matthias Islands of Papua New Guinea.

References

External links 
 BirdLife Species Factsheet

Rhipidura
Birds of the Bismarck Archipelago
Birds described in 1902